Get Your Kicks is the debut studio album by German singer-songwriter Fancy, released in 1985, by Metronome Records.

Track listing

Charts

References

External links 

 

1985 debut albums
Fancy (singer) albums